What If? 2, subtitled More What If?: Eminent Historians Imagine What Might Have Been, is an anthology of twenty-five essays dealing with counterfactual history. It was published by G.P. Putnam's Sons in 2001, and edited by Robert Cowley. It is the successor of What If? It was combined with the original What If? in The Collected What If?

Essays
 "Socrates Dies at Delium, 424 BC" by Victor Davis Hanson 
 What if Socrates had died before his philosophy was written down by Plato? 
 "Not by a Nose" by Josiah Ober
 What if Antony and Cleopatra had won the Battle of Actium?
 "Pontius Pilate Spares Jesus" by Carlos M. N. Eire
 What if Jesus had not been crucified and instead lived into old age?
 "Repulse at Hastings, October 14, 1066" by Cecelia Holland
 What if William had not conquered England?
 "The Chinese Discovery of the New World, 15th century" by Theodore F. Cook, Jr.
 What if Zheng He's expeditions had been allowed to continue?
 "Martin Luther Burns at the Stake, 1521" by Geoffrey Parker
 What if Martin Luther had been sentenced to death at the Diet of Worms?
 "If Charles I Had Not Left Whitehall, August 1641" by Theodore K. Rabb
 What if the English king had died from an outbreak of plague in 1641?
 "Napoléon's Invasion of North America" by Thomas Fleming
 What if yellow fever had not decimated the French forces in Haiti in 1802?
 "If Lincoln Had Not Freed the Slaves" by Tom Wicker
 What if there was no Emancipation Proclamation?
 "France Turns the Other Cheek, July 1870" by Alistair Horne
 What if there had been no Franco-Prussian War?
 "The Election of Theodore Roosevelt, 1912" by John Lukacs
 What if Roosevelt had received the Republican nomination for President over incumbent William Howard Taft in 1912?
 "The Great War Torpedoed" by Robert L. O'Connell
 What if German Chancellor Theobald von Bethmann Hollweg had not prevented the Imperial German Navy from continuing unrestricted submarine warfare after the Sinking of the RMS Lusitania?
 "No Finland Station" by George Feifer
 What if Lenin had been stopped before he arrived at Petrograd?
 "The Luck of Franklin Delano Roosevelt" by Geoffrey C. Ward
 What if FDR's life or circumstances had been different in the 20th century?  (Seven counterfactual scenarios are presented here.)
 "The War of 1938" by Williamson Murray
 What if Britain and France had declared war on Nazi Germany after the invasion of Czechoslovakia?
 "Prime Minister Halifax" by Andrew Roberts
 What if Lord Halifax had been Prime Minister instead of Churchill?
 "The Boys Who Saved Australia, 1942" by James Bradley
 What if the Japanese had won the Kokoda Track campaign?
 "Enigma Uncracked" by David Kahn
 What if Bletchley Park had failed to crack the Wehrmacht Enigma code?
 "Pius XII Protests The Holocaust" by Robert Katz
 What if the Vatican had been more forceful against the Nazi regime? 
 "VE Day—November 11, 1944" by Caleb Carr
 What if Patton and Montgomery's armies had been allowed to advance into Germany after D-Day rather than pursue a "broad front" strategy?
 "The Führer in the Dock" by Roger Spiller
 What if Hitler had lived to stand trial?
 "No Bomb, No End" by Richard B. Frank
 What if Operation Olympic had proceeded on November 1, 1945?
 "The Presidency of Henry Wallace" by James Chace
 What if Franklin Roosevelt had not chosen Harry S. Truman as his 1944 running mate?
 "A Tale of Three Congressmen, 1948" by Lance Morrow
 What if Nixon, Johnson, and Kennedy had chosen different paths than they did?
 "What if Pizarro Had Not Found Potatoes in Peru?" by William H. McNeill

Reviews
 "As a mental exercise or from simple curiosity, it is not uncommon to wonder what might have happened if an event had ended other than as history records." —Washington Times
 "A follow-up to the 1999 book by prominent historians who each examine a key moment in history and theorize how a slight turn of fate at a decisive moment could have changed history. The first book helped give alternate history its 'serious' look, and this book should cement that." —USA Today

See also
What If? (essays)
What Ifs? of American History

References

2001 non-fiction books
Alternate history anthologies
American non-fiction books
G. P. Putnam's Sons books
Essay anthologies
Cultural depictions of Mark Antony
Cultural depictions of Augustus
Cultural depictions of Winston Churchill
Cultural depictions of Cleopatra
Cultural depictions of Adolf Hitler
Cultural depictions of Lyndon B. Johnson
Cultural depictions of John F. Kennedy
Cultural depictions of Vladimir Lenin
Cultural depictions of Abraham Lincoln
Cultural depictions of Martin Luther
Cultural depictions of Richard Nixon
Cultural depictions of George S. Patton
Cultural depictions of Franklin D. Roosevelt
Cultural depictions of Theodore Roosevelt
Cultural depictions of William Howard Taft
Cultural depictions of Wilhelm II
Cultural depictions of William the Conqueror
American Civil War alternate histories
World War II alternate histories
2001 anthologies